Duisky  ( – "black water", referring to the dark appearance of Loch Eil) is a small hamlet on the south shore of Loch Eil, directly across from Fassfern, and approximately  west of Fort William on the south shore of Loch Eil, Lochaber,  Scottish Highlands and is in the Scottish council area of Highland.

References

External links

Populated places in Lochaber